This is a list of lighthouses in the province of Prince Edward Island, Canada.

See also
List of lighthouses in Canada

References

External links
 

 
Prince Edward Island
Lighthouses